Kamil Paweł Grosicki (born 8 June 1988) is a Polish professional footballer who plays as a winger for Ekstraklasa club Pogoń Szczecin and the Poland national team.

A full international for Poland with over eighty caps since 2008, he represented the country at UEFA Euro 2012 and Euro 2016, as well as the 2018 and 2022 FIFA World Cup.

Club career
Grosicki began his career at Pogoń Szczecin. In 2007, he joined Legia Warsaw, although after a few months, he requested a loan move due to personal problems. On 13 February 2008, it was announced that he would go on loan to Swiss side Sion until 31 December 2008. He played in eight matches and scored two goals during the second half of the 2007–08 Ekstraklasa. At the start of the following season, he was dropped to the under-21 team by the club's new manager. He left the club a few months later.

Jagiellonia Białystok
In February 2009, Jagiellonia Białystok took Grosicki on loan until the end of the 2008–09 season, with the club also securing the right to buy him for 500,000 złoty. Grosicki signed a three-year contract with Jagiellonia which began in June 2009.

Sivasspor
Grosicki's second stint abroad was with Süper Lig side Sivasspor, where he was transferred to in January 2011 for approximately €900,000 on a three-and-a-half-year contract.

Rennes

On 24 January 2014, Grosicki transferred to French side Rennes in Ligue 1. He scored the first goal of their surprise 2–0 win over Lille on 27 March, which put Rennes into the semi-finals of the Coupe de France. In the semi-final on 15 April, he scored again in a 3–2 win over Angers. Grosicki played 52 minutes of the final before being substituted for Paul-Georges Ntep as Rennes went on to lose 2–0 to Guingamp. During his time with Rennes, Grosicki made 85 appearances and scored 13 goals.

Hull City
On 31 January 2017, Grosicki signed a three-and-a-half year contract with Premier League club Hull City. He made his debut in Hull City's 2–0 victory over Liverpool on 4 February 2017.

Grosicki won PFA Fans' Premier League Player of the Month for April.
Grosicki scored his first goal for the club on 12 August 2017, when he netted the second goal in a 4–1 home win against Burton Albion.

West Bromwich Albion
On 31 January 2020, Grosicki signed an 18-month contract with West Bromwich Albion for an undisclosed fee. The fee was reported as in the region of £1 million, with add-ons based on promotion to the Premier League. He scored his first goal for the club in a 4–2 home win against his former club, Hull City on 5 July 2020. 

On 27 May 2021, it was announced that Grosicki would leave West Bromwich Albion following the conclusion of his contract.

International career

Grosicki appeared for the Poland under-21 side. On 2 February 2008, he made his senior debut for Poland in a friendly against Finland.

Grosicki was selected in the country's squad as it co-hosted UEFA Euro 2012. His sole appearance in the tournament came on 16 June in the second group match in Wrocław, replacing Eugen Polanski for the final 34 minutes of a 1–0 defeat to the Czech Republic.

On his 24th cap on 7 September 2014, Grosicki scored his first two goals for Poland in a 7–0 win away to Gibraltar at the start of UEFA Euro 2016 qualification.

Representing Poland at Euro 2016, he was a key player for his national team, providing two assists in the competition for Jakub Błaszczykowski's goal against Switzerland in the round of 16 and Robert Lewandowski's goal against Portugal in the quarter-finals.

After the match against England in March 2021, he ceased to be appointed by the coach Paulo Sousa and ultimately did not find himself in the wide squad for Euro 2020. He returned to the national team in March 2022, when Czesław Michniewicz called him up for matches against: Scotland (friendly match) and Sweden (play-offs to the World Cup). Grosicki only played in the match against this first opponent.

Personal life
Kamil has two sisters; Kornelia, who is also a professional footballer, and Oliwia. He is married to Dominika.

Career statistics

Club

International

Scores and results list Poland's goal tally first, score column indicates score after each Grosicki goal.

Honours
Legia Warsaw
 Polish Cup: 2007–08

Jagiellonia Białystok
 Polish Cup: 2009–10
 Polish Super Cup: 2010

Individual
 PFA Fans' Premier League Player of the Month: April 2017

References

External links

Kamil Grosicki's national team stats on the website of the Polish Football Association 
Sivasspor was Kamil Grosicki Transfer 

1988 births
Living people
Polish footballers
Poland international footballers
Jagiellonia Białystok players
Legia Warsaw players
Pogoń Szczecin players
FC Sion players
Sivasspor footballers
Stade Rennais F.C. players
Hull City A.F.C. players
West Bromwich Albion F.C. players
Ekstraklasa players
Swiss Super League players
Süper Lig players
Ligue 1 players
Premier League players
Polish expatriate footballers
Expatriate footballers in Switzerland
Expatriate footballers in Turkey
Expatriate footballers in France
Expatriate footballers in England
Polish expatriate sportspeople in Switzerland
Polish expatriate sportspeople in Turkey
Polish expatriate sportspeople in France
Polish expatriate sportspeople in England
Sportspeople from Szczecin
UEFA Euro 2012 players
UEFA Euro 2016 players
2018 FIFA World Cup players
2022 FIFA World Cup players
Association football wingers
English Football League players
Poland youth international footballers
Poland under-21 international footballers